Tuv Buganuud FC is a Mongolian association football club from Töv Province that currently competes in the Mongolia Premier League.

History
The club was founded in 2018 with the support of the local government of Töv Province. It was promoted to the Mongolia Premier League for the first time for the 2021–22. They earned promotion by finishing runner-up in the Mongolian First League in 2021 then defeating Khoromkhon FC in a play-off series.

Domestic history
Key

Roster

References

External links
MFF profile
Eleven Sports channel

Football clubs in Mongolia
2018 establishments in Mongolia